Andrew J. Fenady (October 4, 1928 – April 16, 2020) was an American actor, screenwriter, producer, and novelist.

Biography
After studying literature and economics at the University of Toledo, Fenady turned to cinema and theatre and moved to Hollywood. He began as a screenwriter for the television series Confidential File, directed by Paul Coates, and he met director Irvin Kershner. He wrote the screenplay for the 1958 film Stakeout on Dope Street, before following it up with The Young Captives. Fenady and Kershner soon thereafter began a longtime partnership in the cinema. In 1957, Warner Bros. signed the pair to a long-term contract.

Fenady wrote the series The Rebel alongside the actor Nick Adams, while Kershner directed the show's 76 episodes. He then wrote the script for the Western Ride Beyond Vengeance and produced the television series Branded.

In 1967, Fenady worked on a new television series, Hondo, based on the movie Hondo. The project turned into a TV movie, and brought Fenady to write Chisum in the 1970s, directed by Andrew V. McLaglen and starring John Wayne.

During his career, Fenady also acted on occasion. He played Philip Sheridan in the TV series The Rebel. He received a Golden Boot Award in 1995.

Death
Fenady died on April 16, 2020 in Los Angeles, California at the age of 91.

Filmography

Screenwriter

Cinema
Stakeout on Dope Street (1958)
The Young Captives (1959)
Ride Beyond Vengeance (1966)
Chisum (1970)
Terror in the Wax Museum (1973)
Arnold (1973)
The Man with Bogart's Face (1980)

Telefilms
Las Vegas Beat (1961)
Postmark: Jim Fletcher (1963)
Hondo (1967)
Black Noon (1971)
The Hanged Man (1974)
Mayday at 40,000 feet! (1976)
The Hostage Heart (1977)
The Mask of Alexander Cross (1977)
A Masterpiece of Murder (1986)
Jake Spanner, Private Eye (1989)
Yes, Virginia, there is a Santa Claus (1991)
The Sea Wolf (1993)

TV Series
Confidential File (1955–1958)
The Rebel (1959–1961)
Branded (1965–1966)
Hondo (1967)

Producer

Cinema
Stakeout on Dope Street (1958)
The Young Captives (1959)
Broken Sabre (1965)
Ride Beyond Vengeance (1966)
Chisum (1970)
Terror in the Wax Museum (1973)
Arnold (1973)
The Man with Bogart's Face (1980)

Telefilms
Las Vegas Beat (1961)
Hondo (1967)
Black Noon (1971)
The Woman Hunter (1972)
The Voyage of the Yes (1973)
The Stranger (1973)
Sky Heist (1973)
The Hanged Man (1974)
Mayday at 40,000 Feet! (1976)
The Hostage Heart (1977)
The Mask of Alexander Cross (1977)
Who Is Julia? (1986)
Jake Spanner, Private Eye (1989)
The Love She Sought (1990)
Yes, Virginia, there is a Santa Claus (1991)
The Sea Wolf (1993)

TV Series
The Rebel (1959–1961)
Branded (1965–1966)
Hondo (1967)

Actor

Cinema
Stakeout on Dope Street (1958)

Telefilms and TV Series
The Rebel (1960)
Las Vegas Beat (1961)
Branded (1965–1966)
The Love She Sought (1990)
The Sea Wolf (1993)

Literary Works

Novels
The Secret of Sam Marlow (1980)
Claws of the Eagle: A Novel of Tom Horn And the Apache Kid (1984)
The Summer of Jack London  (1985)
Mulligan (1989)
Runaways (1994)
There Came a Stranger (2001)
The Rebel Johnny Yuma (2002)
Double Eagles (2002)
A Night in Beverly Hills (2003)
Riders to Moon Rock (2005)
A Night in Hollywood Forever (2006)
Big Ike (2007)
The Trespassers (2008)
Tom Horn and the Apache Kid (2009)
The Range Wolf (2012)
Destiny Made Them Brothers (2013)
Black Noon (2015)

Plays
The Man with Bogart's Face: A Play in Two Acts (2000)

Awards
Golden Boot Award (1995)

References

External links

1928 births
2020 deaths
University of Toledo alumni
American television actors
Male actors from Toledo, Ohio
Writers from Toledo, Ohio